Neolamprologus tretocephalus is a species of cichlid endemic to Lake Tanganyika where it is found in sandy areas in the northern half of the lake.  It is a predator on molluscs.  This species can reach a length of  TL.  This species can also be found in the aquarium trade.

References

tretocephalus
Taxa named by George Albert Boulenger
Fish described in 1898
Fish of Lake Tanganyika
Taxonomy articles created by Polbot